"Car Song" is a song by the Britpop group Elastica. It was originally released in 1995 on the band's self-titled debut album. It was released as a single in North America and Australia in January 1996 but was never issued in the UK.

The song, which is about having sex in a car, received positive reviews from critics. It peaked at #33 on the US Alternative Songs chart and at #14 on the Canadian alternative chart.

Background
"Car Song" was written by Elastica's lead singer, Justine Frischmann. The song is about having sex in a car.

Release
"Car Song" was first released on Elastica's self-titled debut album on 14 March 1995. Its five-track CD single was released in 1996 by Geffen Records. Another version of the song, titled "Four Wheeling", was included on Elastica's compilation album, Elastica Radio One Sessions.

Critical reception
"Car Song" received generally positive reviews from music critics. According to Stephen Thomas Erlewine, the song "makes sex in a car actually sound sexy". Entertainment Weeklys Chuck Eddy wrote that "Justine Frischmann's awkward sex-in-a-Ford-Fiesta forwardness ("Car Song") can charm your pants off."

Chart performance
In the US, the single spent three weeks on the Alternative Songs chart and peaked at #33 on 23 December 1995. It also spent nine weeks on the Canadian alternative chart, peaking at #14 there.

In popular media
"Car Song" was included on an episode of Gilmore Girls in addition to appearing on the show's soundtrack Our Little Corner of the World: Music from Gilmore Girls. The song was also featured in TV show Hindsight.

Music video
The song's music video, directed by Spike Jonze, has been described as a "futuristic thriller combining elements of Blade Runner and Japanese monster films".

Track list
CD single
 "Car Song" [LP Version]
 "Car Song" (Live)
 "Bar Bar Bar" (Demo)
 "Jam" [II] (Live)
 "Gloria" (Live)

Charts

References

External links

1996 singles
1995 songs
Elastica songs
Songs written by Justine Frischmann
Songs about cars
Geffen Records singles
Music videos directed by Spike Jonze